Televisão de Cachorro is the fourth studio album of the Brazilian rock band Pato Fu. The album was produced by Dudu Marote.

Track listing
 "A Necrofilia da Arte" (The Necrophilia of Art) (Rubinho Troll/Gilberto Gil) – 4:04
 "Antes que Seja Tarde" (Before It's Too Late) (Tarcisio Moura/John Ulhoa/Fernanda Takai) – 4:15
 "Nunca Diga" (Never Say) (Frank Jorge) – 2:08
 "Eu Sei" (I Know) (Renato Russo) – 3:05
 "Licitação" (Bidding) (John Ulhoa) – 2:43
 "Vivo num Morro" ("I Live on a Hill", but it can be interpreted as "I Live, I Don't Die") (John Ulhoa) – 3:37
 "Um Dia, Um Ladrão" (One Day, One Thief) (John Ulhoa) – 2:33
 "Canção pra Você Viver Mais" (Song for You to Live More) (John Ulhoa) – 5:24
 "Tempestade" (Storm) (M. Vouraski/Marrara/Carlos Pinduca/Prata/Joana Lewis/Txotxa) – 2:48
 "O Mundo Não Mudou" (The World Hasn't Changed) (John Ulhoa) – 2:44
 "Televisão de Cachorro" (Doggy TV) (John Ulhoa) – 3:41
 "Spaceballs, the Ballad" (Zuim/Bert/Bob Faria) – 4:28
 "Boa Noite" (Good Night) (Ricardo Kóctus) – 2:54

Personnel
Pato Fu
 Fernanda Takai - vocals (lead on 1—4, 6—9 and 11), acoustic and electric guitars
 John Ulhoa - vocals (lead on "Licitação" and "O Mundo Não Mudou"), acoustic and electric guitars, programming; choir and response yells on "Licitação"
 Ricardo Koctus - bass, vocals (lead on "Boa Noite"); extra solo response yells on "Licitação"
 Xande Tamietti - drums, percussion

Additional musicians
 André Abujamra e Edu K - choir and voice actors on "Licitação"
 Marcos Bowie - choir on "Licitação" and LSD choir on "Spaceballs"
 Dudu Marote and Aluízer Malab - response yells on "Licitação"
 James Muller - percussion (on "Vivo num Morro", "Licitação" and "Spaceballs")
 Ed Côrtes - baritone and tenor saxophone on "Vivo num Morro"
 Sidney Borgani - trombone on "Vivo Num Morro"
 Nahor Gomes - trumpet on "Vivo num Morro"

Production
 Dudu Marote - production
 Luis Paulo Serafim - recording, mixing
 Leon Zervos - mastering at Absolute Audio
 Getúlio, Enrico Romano. Rodrigo Paciência, Rogério Pereira  e Rodrigo - overdubs
 Márcio Thees, Max PA, Carlos Blau. Pedro Cortes e Joy Passarelli: studio assistants
 Luiz Otávio Âmbar e Kerley Gonçalves - roadies

Curiosities
 The disc's eighth track, "Canção pra Você Viver Mais," is dedicated to Fernanda's father, who suffered from a serious illness. Takai had already written the title without being able to compose a letter to her father. John, upon learning this, wrote the music and presented it to Fernanda, who thanked Ulhoa for managing to externalize what she felt to be losing.

References

External links
  John's interview with Tem Mas Acabou. 

Pato Fu albums
1998 albums